Jefferson School District may refer to:

Jefferson County School District in Birmingham, Alabama
Jefferson Patriots School District in Phoenix, Arizona
Jefferson County R-1 School District in Golden, Colorado
Jefferson County School District in Monticello, Florida
Jefferson City School District in Jefferson, Georgia
Jefferson County School District in Louisville, Georgia
Jefferson County School District 251 in Rigby, Idaho
West Jefferson School District in Terreton, Indiana
Jefferson–Scranton Community School District in Jefferson, Iowa
Jefferson County School District in Louisville, Kentucky
Jefferson County School District, in Fayette, Mississippi
Jefferson County School District, in Jefferson New York
Jefferson Area Local School District, in Jefferson, Ohio
Jefferson Local School District, in West Jefferson, Ohio
Jefferson Township Local School District, in Dayton, Ohio
Jefferson School District, Oregon in Jefferson, Oregon
Jefferson County School District (Oregon) in Madras, Oregon
Jefferson County School District, in Dandridge, Tennessee
Jefferson Independent School District in Jefferson, Texas
Jefferson County School District in Charles Town, West Virginia
Jefferson County School District in Jefferson, Wisconsin
Jefferson School District in Tracy, California.
Jefferson Schools in Monroe County, Michigan

See also
Franklin-Jefferson County Social Education District in Benton, Illinois
Jefferson Davis County School District in Prentiss, Missouri
Port Jefferson UF School District in Port Jefferson, New York
South Jefferson County School District in Adams Center, New York
Gahanna-Jefferson City School District in Gahanna, Ohio
Jefferson-Morgan School District in Jefferson, Pennsylvania
Jefferson Hills School District in Jefferson Hills, Pennsylvania
West Jefferson Hills School District in Jefferson Hills, Pennsylvania
Elk Point-Jefferson School District 61-7 in Elk Point, South Dakota
Hardin-Jefferson Independent School District in Sour Lake, Texas